The 1894 Centre football team represented Centre College as an independent the 1894 college football season. Led by Eugene Messler in his first and only season as head coach, Centre compiled a record of 3–1.

Schedule

References

Centre
Centre Colonels football seasons
Centre football